Frankfort, Wisconsin is the name of some places in the U.S. state of Wisconsin:
Frankfort, Marathon County, Wisconsin, a town
Frankfort, Pepin County, Wisconsin, a town